The Independence Party of the Czech Republic (SNČR) previously called Referendum on the European Union was a Czech Eurosceptic political party founded by František Matějka, a former member of the Party of Free Citizens. Matějka resigned as leader on May 22, 2020.

Election results

European Parliament

References

External links
Official website 

2017 establishments in the Czech Republic
Eurosceptic parties in the Czech Republic
Political parties established in 2017
Political parties disestablished in 2022
Political parties in the Czech Republic
Right-wing parties in the Czech Republic
Conservative parties in the Czech Republic